is a Japanese actor.

Biography
Naoto was born as the second son of Ken Ogata. He made his debut in the film Yūshun Oracion in 1988.

Ogata landed a lead role in the 1992 Taiga drama Nobunaga King of Zipangu, he played the role of Oda Nobunaga.

Filmography

Film

Television

Awards

References

External links
 Official website 
 

1967 births
Japanese male film actors
Japanese male television actors
Living people
Male actors from Yokohama
Taiga drama lead actors
20th-century Japanese male actors
21st-century Japanese male actors